Robert Edison Sandiford (born 1968) is a Canadian novelist, short story writer and essayist. Born in Montreal, Quebec, he co-founded with the poet Linda M. Deane ArtsEtc, a periodical devoted to culture in Barbados. In 2003, his short story "Reckoning" was awarded the Barbados Governor General's Award for Literary Excellence.

Bibliography

Fiction 
12 X 93 — 1993 (with Sonja Skarstedt & Brian Busby)
Winter, Spring, Summer, Fall: Stories — 1995
The Tree of Youth and Other Stories — 2005
Intimacy 101: Rooms & Suites — 2013
And Sometimes They Fly: A Novel — 2013
Fairfield: The Last Sad Stories of G. Brandon Sisnett — 2015

Graphic Novels 
Attractive Forces — 1997 (with Justin Norman)
Stray Moonbeams — 2002 (with Justin Norman & Brandon Graham)
Great Moves — 2010 (with Geof Isherwood)

Non-Fiction 
Sand for Snow: A Caribbean-Canadian Chronicle — 2003

External links
Robert Edison Sandiford - (Biography) Writers' Union of Canada 
Robert Edison Sandiford 

1968 births
Canadian male short story writers
Black Canadian writers
Canadian people of Barbadian descent
Living people
Writers from Montreal
20th-century Canadian short story writers
21st-century Canadian short story writers
20th-century Canadian male writers
21st-century Canadian male writers